Noah Henson I is the lead guitarist for the Christian rock band Pillar. He was ready to shoot the music video for For The Love of The Game and he got the call that his wife, Lindsey Henson had gone in labor. Henson was nominated for a Grammy Award in 2007.

References

External links 
 Pillar: Official Website

1981 births
Living people
Guitarists from Oklahoma
American performers of Christian music
American heavy metal guitarists
Pillar (band) members